North Halmahera Regency is a regency (on Halmahera Island) of North Maluku Province, Indonesia. It was declared a Regency on 31 May 2003. The capital town of the regency lies at the port of Tobelo. The official estimate as at mid 2021 was 199,936. The principal settlements are Tobelo, Kao and Galela. The area is noted for its white beaches and coral reefs.

Apart from the importance of its 115 islands (19 have remained unnamed) for spices, North Hamahera was a World War II base camp. The Japanese and the American allies fought for its control. From the island of Morotai, Americans headed by the General of the Army Douglas MacArthur prepared for an attack on the Philippines.

Halmahera and its small islands are located in the Coral Triangle, which has rich marine life. Marine biodiversity data on reef fishes was collected during a rapid survey conducted at 28 locations in 2005 in the south-western part of Halmahera. Explorer Gerry Allen, during his diving surveys in 2005, recorded 803 species of reef fishes.

History

During the 15th and 16th centuries, the area was generally within the sphere of influence of the powerful sultanate on the island of Ternate. A larger region, called Moro, included the island of Morotai and parts of the North Halmahera coastline.
The Portuguese were a formidable presence in the area and they built a number of fortifications and controlled the island Ternate, off the southwest coast of the North Halmahera Regency. In the mid-16th century, a Portuguese Jesuit mission visited Hakmahera and Morotai. This created conflict with Muslims who at the time controlled Ternate and Halmahera and in 1571, they drove the Christians from Morotai.

In the early 17th century, the town of Dodinga, strategically located on Halmahera's west coast grew in influence. In 1627 and 1628, Sultan Hamzah of Ternate had much of the Christian population of the island moved to Malaya, on Ternate. Later, it was administered under the Dutch East Indies.

North Halmahera, particularly Morotai, played a role in  World War II. Morotai Island was captured by the Japanese in early 1942. Morotai's southern plain was taken by American forces in September 1944 during the Battle of Morotai, and used as a staging point for the Allied invasion of the Philippines in early 1945, and of Borneo in May and June of that year. Japanese soldier Teruo Nakamura was discovered in the Morotai jungle in 1974, as one of the WWII Japanese soldiers who held out subsequent to the Japanese military's surrender. Morotai Island is, since 2009, no longer part of North Halmahera Regency.

Since the 1980s, mining development and logging has dramatically increased in the area, often causing conflict with local inhabitants. The communities are dependent on fishing and forests and the financial benefits of these resources have gone to Jakarta and local elites outside Halmahera. These developments have also increased religious tension in the region. The Christians of North Halmahera were traditionally said to generally live a peaceful co-existence with Muslims, but violence broke out between the two religious groups in December 1999 and has since been the primary cause of conflict in the region. Many of the Christians on the island fled to Tobelo as a haven when the violence broke out. Shortly after the official area of the North Halmahera Regency was declared on 31 May 2003, in July 2003, 38 villages in Halmahera staged a protest against the Australian mining company Newcrest who is mining gold in the region.

When the decision was made to create the regency of North Halmahera, it was promised in the national parliament in Jakarta that a duty-free port similar to Batam would be established on Morotai Island. However, this never happened, as internal conflict led to a demand that Morotai should be separated from the regency. Hein Nemotemo, a Christian politician, rejected this move, given that Morotai is overwhelmingly Muslim. In August 2006, five members of the North Halmahera Regency legislature from Golkar, including Abdul Gafur lobbied in the national capital for the separation of Morotai as a new regency distinct from the North Halmahera Regency. This was approved by the Committee II in Jakarta and also by the provincial governor Thaib Armaiyn. From February to April 2007, supporters of the Morotai separatist movement sealed off the government headquarters, demanding that Morotai should become separate immediately. The split was delayed and in 2008, Nemotemo's group were all that stood in the way of the split. Fearing a repeat of the 1999-2000 violence, Nemotemo backed down. During the 2009 elections in Indonesia a governor candidate for Morotai was elected and it became a new regency.

Geography and environment

The North Halmahera Regency is located in northeastern Indonesia between the islands of New Guinea and Sulawesi. It occupies roughly half of the northern mainland section of the island and includes smaller islands (Loloda Kepulauan) off the northwest coast of Halmahera. It formerly included the larger island of Morotai to the northeast of the headland but this was administratively separated to form its own regency in 2009. 

Natural ecosystems found in the two regions in North Halmahera Regency, among others, include coral reefs, mangrove forests, seagrass beds, sandy beaches, rocky beaches, estuaries, lagoons and deltas. While artificial ecosystems, among others, include the areas of tourism, ports and fish landing centres, cultivated areas and residential areas of society. The coral reefs of North Halmahera are of particular note, and form part of the Coral Triangle which is world-renowned for its coastal and marine biodiversity, which includes 70 genera of corals and about 2,500 fish species, about 70 percent of all fish species known to the western Indo-Pacific. The Wildlife Conservation Society is working with the Department of Marine Fisheries-DKP of the provincial government of North Maluku to monitor this environment.

Marine conservation and tourism
Halmahera's marine biodiversity and rich marine resources are not receiving the needed marine conservation priority attention. The objective of this attention should be to combine it with development of other economic sectors such as fisheries, marine tourism, oil and gas, and achieve a sustainable economic development of the marine resources and conserve its marine diversity value. To take appropriate decisions in the matter, the Nature Conservancy, WWF-Indonesia and other partners have initiated studies for a preliminary assessment on the prospects for "marine conservation and tourism in the Halmahera area". The surveys also cover study of the ecological link between Halmahera and the Bird's Head Seascape to the east and the Sulu-Sulawesi Seascape on the west.

Administration
The regency was formerly divided into twenty-two districts (kecamantan) and contained 260 villages. More recently, the creation in 2009 of a separate regency for Morotai Island has removed the five districts on that island from North Halmahera, and thus it now contains seventeen districts, tabulated below from south to north with their areas, their 2010 Census and 2020 Census populations, together with the official estimates for mid 2021, The table also includes the location of the district administrative centres, the number of administrative villages (rural desa and urban kelurahan) in each district and their postcodes.

Notes: (a) includes Pulau Bobale (Bobale Island) off the east coast of Halmahera. (b) includes 6 small offshore islands. (c) includes 6 small offshore islands. (d) includes 7 small offshore islands. (e) includes 3 small offshore islands. (f) comprising a group of 58 islands off the northwest coast of Halmahera.

Demographics

As of 2010, North Halmahera had a population of 161,580, which rose by 2020 to 197,640, and by mid 2021 was about 200,000. The main native ethnic groups are Tobelorese, Galelarese, Lolodarese, Kaonese, Pagu and Modole. The remaining 10% are immigrants, mainly from Java, Sulawesi and other parts of North Maluku, especially Makian Island. Apart from the Indonesian language, the indigenous inhabitants have their own languages; one such language is Tobelo spoken by about 30,000 people in the island of Halhamera; another is Galela, spoken by about 80,000 people on Halmahera.

Economy

About 75% of the population of North Halmahera are dependent on agriculture, especially plantation coconut and clove. Tobelo, South Tobelo and Galela are the highest oil producing areas and contain several oil terminals. Aside from those mentioned above, the main crops grown are banana, rice, corn, peanuts, soybeans, cassava, maize, coffee, cocoa, nutmeg and some types of fruits such as oranges, mango and durian. Some types of livestock have been developed, including goat, cattle, chickens, hens, and pigs. Mining reserves have been identified in the area, namely gold, natural gas and nickel ore. There are gold mines in Kao District and Loloda District (Dotia village). Geothermal energy resources are also available in the District of Galela (Mamuya village). On Doi Island, some reserves of iron and copper have been found.

Based on research results of the Marine Fisheries Research Institute (1983), the potential of fish resources (standing stock) found in North Halmahera waters is estimated at 644,382.48 tonnes. Fishing is important to the economic activity of the region. Most people in North Halmahera Regency inhabit coastal areas and depend upon these marine ecosystems as a source of social economic life. Until the year 2002, the contribution of capture fisheries production amounted to 98,782.21 tonnes or roughly 65% of the total overall production. In addition to the fish resources, several types of other resources have high economic value and have been exploited by the fishing communities in the coastal areas and small islands, such as crustacea, Egg Sea cucumbers (Holothuroidea), mollusc, and seaweed. The fishing equipment used by most fishermen in the region of North Halmahera is traditional, such as nets. The extent of coastal and marine areas with a high water quality allows for the development of marine aquaculture, especially Grouper, lobster, seaweed and pearls.  Until now, optimisation and productivity of aquaculture in North Halamahera has been low. Until the year 2002 the total area of cultivation of marine, brackish and pond reached 128,110 ha, producing just 46.550 tonnes, or 0.03% of the total volume of production.

There is an availability of facilities and infrastructure to support the economy such as ports, banks, markets and primary business activity which is predominantly concentrated in the capital of Tobelo. GDP in 2005 amounted to 373,693.21 million rupee. In the year 2003, the economy of North Halmahera increased 2.93%, 3.33% in 2004, and 3.54% in 2005.

Culture

One festival of note is the annual North Halmahera Cultural Festival, when the people wear full traditional ceremonial dress.
Traditional weddings in the capital of Tobelo are also said to be among the most colourful in Maluku and the Christians follow traditions during their wedding ceremonies, with traditional music and dance. A wedding is typically accompanied by traditional Tobelorese music, played with gongs and drums and a Cakele dance is usually performed in front of the bride as she approaches the groom. Around the time of New Year, Tobelo attracts a number of Yangere groups (such as the Orang Hutan band etc.) from all over North Halmahera who perform music and dances.

The Tobelo language is spoken across North Halmahera by approximately 30,000 people, while Galela is spoken by about 80,000.

Religion

The main religions in North Halmahera are primarily Christianity and Islam. Muslims and Christians had lived here from the 16th century. The two communities lived  peacefully following the cultural tradition of the Hibua Lamo (a pact between Muslims and Christians to live together without aggressive designs against each other and cooperating on all matters of mutual interest). Tobelo, the capital of North Halmahera, in particular is a strong Christian community and was visited by missionaries in the late 19th century and early 20th century also. They left a long-standing legacy and a Protestant church was built in the capital. In Tobelo, a predominantly Christian community celebrates Christmas colourfully with street arches and buntings made with bamboo poles arching over the side of the roads hung with lights and multi-coloured flags. At Easter, local church congregations hold a competition to see who can create the best Easter garden.

 Riots
In the beginning of 1999, there were ethnic clashes between Muslims and Christians in Ambon city, but also in North Maluku where the mostly Christian community of the Kao community attacked the mostly Muslim Makian. This disturbed the peace that existed between the two communities in Ternate, Tidore, Galela and Tobelo, before spreading to the rest of the province. The issue got aggravated in spite of efforts by both groups for reconciliation. Several thousand Christians fled from Ternate and Central Halmahera and took shelter in Tobelo and it turned into a refugee camp. Muslims fled from Tobelo and Kao. However, outside forces like the Laskar Jihad precipitated the issue and there was a gradual built up of tension in the region, which ultimately resulted in the worst rioting in Tobelo on 24 December 1999, which spread to other towns as well and it continued until fall 2000. Remnants of this rioting are still seen and an atmosphere of mistrust prevails. Galela is another town where remnants of strife (burnt out churches and mosques) between religious groups are still seen with military checkposts.

Islands and beaches

North Halmahera Regency has a large number of beaches, islands, parks, lakes, historic monuments, volcano and springs and so forth. Some of the important ones are the following:

Islands
Hibubualamo Kakara
Kakara Island with its oldest Hibualamo near Tobelo is well known for the Tobelorese culture. For those interested in The Hibualamo or village hall, built in traditional style has historical Tobelorese artifacts.

Rorangane island
Rorangane island, an uninhabited island a short distance from Tobelo harbour; has a white sand beach. The sea  waters have coral reefs at a depth of 10–30 metres. It is a good location for diving and swimming.

Somola bay
Somola bay is a group of small rich in mangrove forest that grow out of the rocks. Its waters are clear, good for canoeing and also fishing migrate. Pune village in Galela district is  the nearest to this bay.

Sumsum Island

Sumsum island, a small islet about 3 miles from Daruba town (the port of Morotai), is of historical interest because General of the Army Douglas MacArthur, commander of the Allied Forces in the Asia Pacific region during World War II stayed here and prepared for attack on the Philippines. War relics in the form of bunkers that served as headquarters and the landing site of amphibious ships can be seen here.

Dodola Island
Dodola island, close to Morotai Island, has a swathe of white sand beaches that links to Dodola Besar and Dodola Kecil islands. Set is beautiful surroundings its waters are clear and ideal for swimming, diving and snorkelling.

Beaches
Dorume beach
Dorume beach records huge waves in December, which is good for surfing. The fine sands in the beach shine in the sun due its metallic contents. Tobotobo coral gardens of Loloda Islands district, approached from Dorume beach, have reefs which are good for diving and snorkeling.

Posiposi beach
Posiposi beach, though secluded, has lovely vistas in palm fringed crescent setting. Its attractions are: large waves, reefs and the Mandi waterfall.

Gamlaha beach
Gamlaha beach, a pristine beach,  has white sands and calm waters. Coconut palms provide shades under which the Bobale island could be viewed.

Sosol beach
Sosol beach is the scene of Tosimaru Ship Wreck, a WW II Japanese cargo ship. It is in Malifut district. It has 1 km stretch of black sand beach and has calm waters. However, it becomes very wide during low tide.

Pitu beach
It has black sand on its beach where beach volleyball or soccer games are played. It is a safe place to swim even for children. It has a rich marine life.

Bobale beach
Bobale beach in the Bobale island is approached from the coast of Daru village in Kao district.

Kupakupa beach
Kupakupa beach has large banyan trees on its shores that provide sheltered location in the bay and keeps the waters quiet. Watersports like swimming, canoeing and snorkelling are popular here. The coral reefs in the northern section of the beach are considered one of the best in the coast of North Halmahera.

Kumo beach
Kumo beach on the Kumo island is very near to Tobelo and accessed by motorized canoe. It is set with scenic surroundings and is popular place for swimming. It gives a lovely view of the Tobelo town.

Luari beach
Luari beach is set in the ethnic Galelarese village of Luari, to the north of Tobelo on the Pacific Ocean. Its calm waters provide for good swimming, canoeing and snorkelling. Sunset views from the cape to its north, from Mount Tarakani and the coast of Galela are an attraction to visitors.

Batu Kopi
Batu Kopi means coffee rock. It is located at Posiposi-Rao beach in the South-West Morotai district. Its name is derived from a local tale that professes aroma of coffee emerging from this rock. This aroma is noted during late afternoons.

Lakes and parks
 Telaga Paca lake
Telaga Paca is a small crater lake close to Tobelo town to the south – a few km off the main road. The lake is set in a backdrop of thickly forested hills. There is also a small village by the same name Talaga Paca near the lake, which has a lookout area erected over stilts in the water to view the lake. A canoe could be hired to paddle in the lake. It is the source for drinking water to the village. Villagers do fishing in the lake.
Duma-galela lake

Duma-galela lake is the largest freshwater lake of the Halmahera island. The lake is used for swimming, fishing and canoeing. Bamboo rafts are also used on the lake. Two smaller crater lakes namely  Makete and Ngidiho are also in its vicinity.

Parks
Tobotobo marine park
Tobotobo marine park in Tobotobo village in the Loloda Islands district has coral reef which is good for diving and snorkelling. Fruit-bats abound here roosting in the mangroves. A unique sight seen here is of the wild green and white pigeons bathing in the sea near the village.

Volcano

Dukono volcano
Mount Dukono is a  volcano that is one of three most active volcanoes not only in Halmahera island but also in Indonesia. The volcanic mountain is accessed from the Mamuya village. There is a volcanology  information centre which provides latest information on the current status of the volcano.

Other sights

Mamuya hot spring
Mamuya hot spring in Mamuya village in Galelo is a hot spring emanating from a volcano by the same name. Spring water is said to have curing qualities for skin problems and hence is a popular attraction among the local people. It is only  from Tobelo town.

Wangongira rice field
Wangongira rice fields are known for the special variety of rice grown along the swift flowing river called Molulu. It is located in Wangongira village in West Tobelo.

World War II Japanese tunnels
World War II Japanese tunnels, located below the road, are in the Samuda and Duma villages of West Galela District. The tunnels were used by the Japanese army during WW II. The one in Samuda  Tunnel is 20 meters with many rooms and halls.

See also
List of districts of North Maluku

References

External links
Official site
Map of North Halmahera

Regencies of North Maluku
Halmahera